Magnetic Video Corporation was a home video/home audio duplication service that operated between 1968 and 1982.

History 
Magnetic Video Corporation was established by the co-founder Andre Blay, an American film producer in 1968 with Leon Nicholson and was based in Farmington Hills, Michigan. In 1977, it became the first corporation to release theatrical motion pictures onto Betamax and VHS videocassette for consumer use. (Cartridge Television, Inc. preceded it in 1972 when it introduced the Avco Cartrivision home VCR with a line of major motion pictures available for rent on the Cartrivision videocassette format. Cartrivision went off the market thirteen months after its debut.)

Magnetic Video is notable for its contribution to the birth of the modern-day home video empire and the birth of video rental systems. In the fall of 1977, Blay came up with the idea to release pre-recorded motion pictures on videocassette. That year, he convinced 20th Century Fox, which was then in financial difficulty, to license fifty of their films for home video release in VHS and Betamax formats. Blay also established the Video Club of America in order to sell the titles directly to consumers by mail.

That same year, George Atkinson bought one Betamax and one VHS copy of each of the first 50 movie titles from Magnetic Video that were then being sold to the public and established the Video Station rental company from a storefront in Los Angeles. He charged $50 for an "annual membership" and $100 for a "lifetime membership," which provided the opportunity to rent the videos for $10 a day. This and similar video stores were a success, and Magnetic Video took off, adding titles from the following companies in the next four years, in addition to continuing to release original titles from Fox:
 1978: Viacom, RBC Films/The Charles Chaplin estate, and AVCO Embassy Pictures
 1979: Brut Productions, Bill Burrud Productions, and Pathé newsreels
 1980: ABC Pictures, ITC (Magnetic's first release from ITC was The Muppet Movie), and American Film Theatre
 1981: United Artists (UA; including pre-1950 Warner Bros. films which were owned by UA at that time), in addition to establishing short-lived sports and laserdisc divisions.

The Magnetic Video project was such a success that it soon came over to the United Kingdom as "Magnetic Video UK" in 1978. Not long after, Magnetic Video branched into Australia, trading under "Magnetic Video Australia".

In March 1979, Fox purchased Magnetic Video, which was a small OTC traded public company (Blay was a major shareholder and Chairman). In January 1982, shortly after Blay's departure from the company, Fox reorganized Magnetic Video into 20th Century-Fox Video. Around the same time, Magnetic Video began to issue films in laserdisc format.  Later that same year, Fox merged its video operations with CBS Video Enterprises, resulting in the creation of CBS/Fox Video on June 18, 1982.

Magnetic Video Corporation famously opened its video releases with an animation of their logo and the words "MAGNETIC VIDEO CORPORATION" repeatedly scrolling upwards and mirrored in the background, and an announcement would come over the mellow guitar and horn music playing:

 "By special arrangement with (movie studio name), Magnetic Video Corporation is proud to offer the following major motion picture on videocassette."

Entertainment companies established in 1968
1982 disestablishments in Michigan
American companies disestablished in 1982
Defunct companies based in Michigan
Home video companies of the United States
20th Century Studios
Companies based in Oakland County, Michigan
1968 establishments in Michigan
American companies established in 1968